Schleswig-Holstein is the northernmost of the 16 states of Germany, comprising most of the historical duchy of Holstein and the southern part of the former Duchy of Schleswig. Its capital city is Kiel; other notable cities are Lübeck and Flensburg.

The region is called Slesvig-Holsten in Danish and pronounced . The Low German name is Sleswig-Holsteen, and the North Frisian name is Slaswik-Holstiinj. Historically, the name can also refer to a larger region, containing both present-day Schleswig-Holstein and the former South Jutland County (Northern Schleswig; now part of the Region of Southern Denmark) in Denmark.

Schleswig (→Southern Jutland) was a Danish territory during the Viking Age, developed into a Jarldom and following into the Duchy of Schleswig in the 12th and 13th century and came later in the 14th century under the control of the Holstein counts of Schauenburg. However, it was constitutionally still a fiefdom of Denmark and bordered Holstein, which was a part of the (German) Holy Roman Empire. Beginning in 1460, both Schleswig and Holstein were ruled together by the Danish king acting as duke of both Schleswig and Holstein, while Holstein remained a fief of the Holy Roman Empire, Schleswig af fief of the Kingdom of Denmark. In the 19th century a conflict arose over the national affiliation of Schleswig, which was claimed by both Danish and German national liberals. While the majority of the population in Holstein was German-oriented, the population in Schleswig was linguistically and culturally mixed Danish-German-Frisian. The resulting long-term political and territorial dispute was known as the Schleswig-Holstein Question. Under the national revoltion year 1848 in both Denmark (→March Revolution) and Germany (→German revolutions) the conflict culminated in the First Schleswig War, which ended in a victory for Denmark and the signing of the 1852 London Protocol. But the fight broke out again in 1864 (the Second Schleswig War), and this time Prussia and Austria won and the territories was absorbed into Prussia in 1867. More than 50 years later, after the German defeat in World War I, the Allies required that the question of sovereignty over the territory be submitted to plebiscites (the 1920 Schleswig plebiscites), which resulted in the return of Northern Schleswig to Denmark. After World War II, Schleswig-Holstein took in over a million refugees.

Today, Schleswig-Holstein's economy is known for its agriculture, such as its Holstein cows. Its position on the Atlantic Ocean makes it a major trade point and shipbuilding site; it is also the location of the Kiel Canal. Its offshore oil wells and wind farms produce significant amounts of energy. Fishing is a major industry, and the basis of its distinctive unique local cuisine. It is a popular tourist destination for Germans and tourists across the globe.

History

The term "Holstein" derives from Old Saxon Holseta Land, (Holz means wood in modern Standardized German; holt is a now-archaic English word for woods.) Originally, the term referred to the central of the three Saxon tribes north of the River Elbe: Tedmarsgoi (Dithmarschen), Holstein and Sturmarii (Stormarn). The area inhabited by the tribe of the Holsts lay between the Stör River and Hamburg; after Christianization, their main church was in Schenefeld. Saxon Holstein became a part of the Holy Roman Empire after Charlemagne's Saxon campaigns in the late eighth century. Beginning in 811, the northern border of Holstein (and thus of the Empire) was the River Eider.

The term “Schleswig” originally referred to the city of Schleswig. The city's name derives from Schlei “inlet” in the east and vik, which meant inlet in Old Norse and settlement in Old Saxon, and is cognate with the "-wick" and "-wich" elements in place-names in Britain.

The Duchy of Schleswig, or Southern Jutland, was originally an integral part of Denmark, but in medieval times was established as a fief under the control of the Kingdom of Denmark, having the same relationship with the Danish Crown as, for example, Brandenburg or Bavaria had with the Holy Roman Emperor. Around 1100, the Duke of Saxony gave Holstein to Count Adolf I of Schauenburg.

Duchies in the Danish realm
Schleswig was an integral part of Denmark under the Viking Age and developed into a duchy later in the 13th century, but remained a fief of Denmark. Holstein was raised to a duchy in 1474, but at the same time remained a fief with the Holy Roman Empire. Schleswig was never part of Germany until after the Second Schleswig War in 1864. But in the late 13th century both territories were ruled by the Holstein counts of Schauenburg and for many centuries, the king of Denmark was both a Danish Duke of Schleswig and a German Duke of Holstein. So both were ruled for several centuries by the kings of Denmark. With the state divisions in 1544, the Gottorp dukes also had parts of both Schleswig and Holstein. In 1721, all of Schleswig was agian united into a single duchy under the king of Denmark, and the great powers of Europe confirmed in an international treaty that all future kings of Denmark should automatically become dukes of Schleswig: consequently, Schleswig would always follow the order of succession that applied in the Kingdom of Denmark. Government business in both duchies was conducted in the German language, even though for a long time they were governed from Copenhagen. (Beginning in 1523, however, they were governed by the German Chancellery, named after the German administration language, which in 1806 was renamed the Schleswig-Holstein Chancellery). After the Protestant Reformation, church services were conducted in German in the southern part of Schleswig, and in Danish in the northern part. This difference would later contribute strongly to shaping the inhabitants’ national sentiments, as would the different languages spoken in different schools after 1814, when mandatory schooling was instituted. At the same time, a language change took place in southern Schleswig in the 18th and 19th centuries, with the German language spreading northwards at the expense of Danish and Frisian

Schleswig-Holstein Question
The German national awakening that followed the Napoleonic Wars gave rise to a strong popular national movement in Holstein and Schleswig for a merger in a future German constitutional state. This development was paralleled by an equally strong Danish national awakening in Denmark and Schleswig. This movement called for the complete reintegration of Schleswig into the Kingdom of Denmark and demanded an end to discrimination against Danes in Schleswig. The ensuing conflict is sometimes called the Schleswig-Holstein Question. In 1848, King Frederick VII of Denmark declared that he would grant Denmark a liberal constitution and the immediate goal for the Danish national movement was to ensure that this constitution would give rights to all Danes, i.e. not only to those in the Kingdom of Denmark, but also to Danes (and Germans) living in Schleswig. Furthermore, they demanded protection for the Danish language in Schleswig (the dominant language in almost a quarter of Schleswig had changed from Danish to German since the beginning of the 19th century).

A liberal constitution for Holstein was not seriously considered in Copenhagen, since it was well known that the political élite of Holstein were more conservative than Copenhagen's. Representatives of German-minded Schleswig-Holsteiners demanded that Schleswig and Holstein be unified and allowed its own constitution and that Schleswig join Holstein as a member of the German Confederation. These demands were rejected by the Danish government in 1848, and the Germans of Holstein and southern Schleswig rebelled. This began the First Schleswig War (1848–51), which ended in a Danish victory at Idstedt.

In 1863, conflict broke out again when Frederick VII died without legitimate issue. According to the order of succession of Denmark and Schleswig, the crowns of both Denmark and Schleswig would pass to Duke Christian of Duchy of Glücksburg, who became Christian IX. The transmission of the duchy of Holstein to the head of the (German-oriented) branch of the Danish royal family, the House of Augustenborg, was more controversial. The separation of the two duchies was challenged by the Augustenborg heir, who claimed, as in 1848, to be rightful heir of both Schleswig and Holstein. The promulgation of a common constitution for Denmark and Schleswig in November 1863 prompted Otto von Bismarck to intervene and Prussia and Austria declared war on Denmark. This was the Second War of Schleswig, which ended in Danish defeat. British attempts to mediate in the London Conference of 1864 failed, and Denmark lost Schleswig (Northern and Southern Schleswig), Holstein, and Lauenburg to Prussia and Austria.

Province of Prussia

Contrary to the hopes of German Schleswig-Holsteiners, the area did not gain its independence, but was annexed as a province of Prussia in 1867. Also following the Austro-Prussian War in 1866, section five of the Peace of Prague stipulated that the people of Northern Schleswig would be consulted in a referendum on whether to remain under Prussian rule or return to Danish rule. This condition, however, was never fulfilled by Prussia. During the decades of Prussian rule within the German Empire, authorities attempted a Germanisation policy in the northern part of Schleswig, which remained predominantly Danish. The period also meant increased industrialisation of Schleswig-Holstein and the use of Kiel and Flensburg as important Imperial German Navy locations. The northernmost part and west coast of the province saw a wave of emigration to America, while some Danes of North Schleswig emigrated to Denmark.

Plebiscite in 1920

Following the defeat of Germany in World War I, the Allied powers arranged a plebiscite in northern and central Schleswig. The plebiscite was conducted under the auspices of an international commission which designated two voting zones to cover the northern and south-central parts of Schleswig. Steps were taken to also create a third zone covering a southern area, but zone III was cancelled again and never voted, as the Danish government asked the commission not to expand the plebiscite to this area.

In zone I covering Northern Schleswig (10 February 1920), 75% voted for reunification with Denmark and 25% voted for Germany. In zone II covering central Schleswig (14 March 1920), the results were reversed; 80% voted for Germany and just 20% for Denmark. Only minor areas on the island of Föhr showed a Danish majority, and the rest of the Danish vote was primarily in the town of Flensburg.

On 15 June 1920, Northern Schleswig officially returned to Danish rule. The Danish/German border was the only one of the borders imposed on Germany by the Treaty of Versailles after World War I which was never challenged by Adolf Hitler.

In 1937, the Nazis passed the so-called Greater Hamburg Act (Groß-Hamburg-Gesetz), where the nearby Free and Hanseatic City of Hamburg was expanded, to encompass towns that had formerly belonged to the Prussian province of Schleswig-Holstein. To compensate Prussia for these losses (and partly because Hitler had a personal dislike for Lübeck), the 711-year-long independence of the Hansestadt Lübeck came to an end, and almost all its territory was incorporated into Schleswig-Holstein.

State of Federal Germany

After World War II, the Prussian province Schleswig-Holstein came under British occupation. On 23 August 1946, the military government abolished the province and reconstituted it as a separate Land.

Due to the forced migrations of Germans between 1944 and 1950, Schleswig-Holstein took in almost a million refugees after the war, increasing its population by 33%. A pro-Danish political movement arose in Schleswig, with transfer of the area to Denmark as an ultimate goal. This was supported neither by the British occupation administration nor the Danish government. In 1955, the German and Danish governments issued the Bonn-Copenhagen Declarations confirming the rights of the ethnic minorities on both sides of the border. Conditions between the nationalities have since been stable and generally respectful.

Geography

Schleswig-Holstein lies on the base of Jutland Peninsula between the North Sea and the Baltic Sea. Strictly speaking, "Schleswig" refers to the German Southern Schleswig ( or Landesteil Schleswig), whereas Northern Schleswig is in Denmark (South Jutland County, Region of Southern Denmark). The state of Schleswig-Holstein further consists of Holstein, as well as Lauenburg and the formerly independent city of Lübeck.

Schleswig-Holstein borders Denmark (Southern Denmark) to the north, the North Sea to the west, the Baltic Sea to the east, and the German states of Lower Saxony, Hamburg, and Mecklenburg-Vorpommern to the south.

In the western part of the state, the lowlands have virtually no hills. The North Frisian Islands, as well as almost all of Schleswig-Holstein's North Sea coast, form the Schleswig-Holstein Wadden Sea National Park (Nationalpark Schleswig-Holsteinisches Wattenmeer) which is the largest national park in Central Europe.

The Baltic Sea coast in the east of Schleswig-Holstein is marked by bays, fjords, and cliff lines. Rolling hills (the highest elevation is the Bungsberg at ) and many lakes are found, especially in the eastern part of Holstein called the Holstein Switzerland and the former Duchy of Lauenburg (Herzogtum Lauenburg). The longest river besides the Elbe is the Eider.

Schleswig-Holstein has the lowest quota of forest covered area, it is only 11.0% (national average 32.0%), which is even lower than in the city-states of Hamburg and Bremen.

The German Islands of Sylt, Föhr, Pellworm, Amrum, Heligoland and Fehmarn are part of Schleswig-Holstein, with the latter being the largest and the only Island of Schleswig-Holstein located on the east coast. Heligoland is Germany's only high-sea island.

Administration

Administrative Division 
Schleswig-Holstein is divided into 11 Kreise (Districts) and four Kreisfreie Städte (Urban Districts).

Legislature 
Schleswig-Holstein has its own parliament and government which are located in the state capital Kiel.

Executive Branch

The Minister-President of Schleswig-Holstein is elected by the Landtag of Schleswig-Holstein.

Recent elections 

State elections were held on 8 May 2022. The current government is a coalition of the Christian Democratic Union (CDU) and The Greens, led by Minister-President Daniel Günther.

List of Minister-Presidents of Schleswig-Holstein

Demographics

Schleswig-Holstein has an aging population. Since 1972 there has been a decrease in the natural rate of population change. In 2016 the total fertility rate reached 1.61, highest value in 40 years (the average value being 1.4). In 2016 there were 25,420 births and 33,879 deaths, resulting in a natural decrease of -8,459.

Vital statistics
Births from January–September 2016 =  19,138
Births from January–September 2017 =  19,086
Deaths from January–September 2016 =  25,153
Deaths from January–September 2017 =  25,832
Natural growth from January–September 2016 =  -6,015
Natural growth from January–September 2017 =  -6,746

Religion

The region has been strongly Protestant since the time of the Protestant Reformation. It is proportionally the most Protestant of the sixteen modern states. In 2018, members of the Evangelical Church in Germany make up 44.6% of the population, while members of the Catholic Church comprise 6.1%.

49.3% either adhere to other religions or disclaim any practising religious identity.

Foreigners
Largest groups of foreign residents by 31 December 2020

Culture

Schleswig-Holstein combines Danish, Frisian and German aspects of culture. The castles and manors in the countryside are the best example for this tradition; some dishes like Rødgrød (literal English "red grits" or "red groats") are also shared, as well as surnames such as Hansen.

The most important festivals are the Kiel Week, Schleswig-Holstein Musik Festival, an annual classic music festival all over the state, and the Lübeck Nordic Film Days, an annual film festival for movies from Scandinavian countries, held in Lübeck. The Kiel Week is an annual event, except for 2020 and 2021 due to the COVID19-Pandemic. It took place again in June 2022.

The annual Wacken Open Air festival is considered to be the largest heavy metal rock festival in the world.

Symbols
The coat of arms shows the symbols of the two duchies united in Schleswig-Holstein, i.e., the two lions for Schleswig and the leaf of nettle for Holstein. Supposedly, Otto von Bismarck decreed that the two lions were to face the nettle because of the discomfort to their bottoms which would have resulted if the lions faced away from it.

Government agencies of Schleswig-Holsteins are using a logo showing a stylized version of the Schleswig Lions and the Holstein nettle combined with the abbreviation of Schleswig-Holstein "SH". Written either below or to the right of the lion and the nettle is "Schleswig-Holstein" below which either the Name of the agency using the logo is shown or the motto "Der echte Norden" (Germany's true North).

The motto of Schleswig-Holstein is "Up ewich ungedeelt" (Middle Low German: "Forever undivided", modern High German: "Auf ewig ungeteilt"). It goes back to the Treaty of Ribe (Danish: Ribe Håndfæstning German: Handfeste von Ripen) in 1460. Ripen (Ribe) is a historical small town in Northern Schleswig, nowadays Denmark.

The anthem from 1844 is called "Wanke nicht, mein Vaterland" ("Don't falter, my fatherland"), but it is usually referred to with its first line "Schleswig-Holstein meerumschlungen" (i.e., "Schleswig-Holstein embraced by the seas") or "Schleswig-Holstein-Lied" (Schleswig-Holstein song).

The old city of Lübeck is a UNESCO World Heritage Site.

Food and drink

Distinctive point of the cuisine is combination of sweetness with a taste contrast like sour or salty. These combinations are also described as "broken sweetness" is especially present in dishes which are sweet-sour.

Typical dishes are:

 Birnen, Bohnen und Speck consist of pears, beans, savory, parsley, bacon and potatoes
 Holsteiner Sauerfleisch is sour aspic
 Holsteiner Katenschinken is ham with traditional cold-smoking method
 Different using of Nordseekraben in soup, porrenpann, with toast or scrambled eggs
 Famous is smoked Kieler Sprotten
 Other fish also is popular: Flatfish or Herring
 Grünkohl. In the Schleswig-Holstein there is a real cult around this vegetable. In the autumn and winter months groups of friends or colleagues go on a cabbage ride and choose their cabbage king, often combined with the typical regional sports of Boßeln and Klootschießen. The most popular dish is Grünkohl with Mettenden, but also possible other combination like Grünkohl with Kassler and 'Schweinebacke'. The Dithmarsch marshland is particularly suitable for growing cabbage. The soils are fertile, so that a good yield can still be achieved even in bad years. Due to the constant sea wind, there are far fewer pests in the area
 Lübecker Marzipan is a sweet made from ground almonds, sugar and added flavorings
 Lakritz confection flavored with extract of the roots of the liquorice plant (sweet, salt, salmiak and choco)
 Lübecker Rotspon, Bordeaux wine, which is delivered in oak barrels to Lübeck and there it maturated.
 Flensburger Rum-Verschnitt, braun mix of oversea rum, water and neutral alcohol (typical 40-42%)

Languages
The official language of Schleswig-Holstein is German. In addition, Low German, Danish and North Frisian are recognized minority languages.

Historically, Low German (in Holstein and Southern Schleswig), Danish (in Schleswig), and North Frisian (in Western Schleswig) were widely spoken in Schleswig-Holstein. During the language change in the 19th century some Danish and North Frisian dialects in Southern Schleswig were replaced by Standard German.

Low German is still used in many parts of the state. Missingsch, a Low German dialect with heavy High German (Standard German) influence, is commonly spoken informally throughout the state, while a mixed language Petuh (mixture of High German and Danish) is used in and around Flensburg. Danish is used by the Danish minority in Southern Schleswig, and North Frisian is spoken by the North Frisians of the North Sea Coast and the Northern Frisian Islands in Southern Schleswig. The North Frisian dialect called Heligolandic (Halunder) is spoken on the island of Heligoland.

As is the case throughout Germany, High German, introduced in the 16th century, has come to steadily replace local dialects for official purposes, and is today the predominant language of media, law and legislature. It is spoken by virtually all inhabitants in formal situations. Since the end of World War II and widespread adoption of TV, radio and other mass media, it has gradually come to supplant local dialects in urban areas as well.

Economy

The Gross domestic product (GDP) of the state was 62.7 billion euros in 2018, accounting for 1.9% of German economic output. GDP per capita adjusted for purchasing power was 30,400 euros or 101% of the EU27 average in the same year. The GDP per employee was 95% of the EU average. The GDP per capita was the lowest of all states in West Germany. In 2017, Schleswig-Holstein had an export surplus for the first time since 1989: export 22.6 billion euros/ import 20.8 billion euros.

Energy
Schleswig-Holstein is a leader in the country's growing renewable energy industry. In 2014, Schleswig-Holstein became the first German state to cover 100% of its electric power demand with renewable energy sources (chiefly wind 70%, solar 3.8%, and biomass 8.3%).

The largest German oil field Mittelplate is located in the North Sea off the Dithmarsch coast and connected with refinery in Hemmingstedt and chemical plants in Brunsbüttel via pipeline. It produce ca. 1.4 million tonnes of oil annually.

Nuclear power 
There were three nuclear power plants in Schleswig-Holstein: Krümmel, Brunsbüttel and Brockdorf. The last operating plant in Schleswig-Holstein, the Brokdorf-plant was shut down on new-years eve 2021.

There is also a nuclear research center known Helmholtz-Zentrum Geesthacht (rebranded as Hereon) with 2 research reactors, located right next to the Krümmel plant.

During the 1990s, ten more cases of leukemia among children than was expected were identified in Elbmarsch, near the Krümmel plant. Anti-nuclear activists believed it was due to the nuclear plant, which led to several investigations. The reported discovery of small spherical beads of nuclear material in the area led to further concern, as well as the presence of minute amounts of plutonium in the Elbe. The origins of the nuclear material were disputed, with one report determining them to not be that of the Krümmel plant. Another report claimed that they may have come from an undisclosed fire in 1986, however this theory has been questioned as it would have required a substantial government coverup. The Chernobyl disaster has also been suggested as a source, though is considered unlikely. The probable source of the material, especially in the Elbe, is nuclear reprocessing plants in France. A 2010 report exonerated the nuclear power plants on the Elbe as the cause of contamination. Further doubt was cast on the nature of the supposed beads of nuclear material, with a Federal commission chastising the original commission that claimed to have discovered the beads. The exact cause of the increased leukemia cases remains unknown, and could be due to other environmental factors, or even by chance.

The nuclear plants have further been questioned as a source of the cases due to comparison to the Savannah River Site in the United States. Despite release of radiation at the Savannah River Site, there is no increase in cases of leukemia around it. Alternative hypotheses for the cause of the cases have included electromagnetic fields, parental radiation exposure prior to conception, other carcinogens, and benzene exposure; however, none have been supported by the existing evidence. Intriguingly, a larger case-control study in Lower Saxony found a correlation between the "untrained immune system" (as judged as contact with other children, vaccinations, etc.) and leukemia risk, suggested that an immature immune system that has not been challenged is at greater risk for developing malignancy, possibly secondary to an undetermined environment factor.

Tourism
Located between the North Sea and the Baltic Sea, Schleswig-Holstein is also a popular tourist destination in Germany. Its islands, beaches and cities attract millions of tourists every year. It has the second highest tourism intensity per local among the German states, after Mecklenburg-Vorpommern, but in absolute value it is rank 6th and only 1/3 of top destination Bavaria. According to a ruling by the Federal Administrative Court, everyone has the right to free access to the beach. Nevertheless, most of the seaside resorts kept cashing in (2-€3 /day/person).

Agriculture

63% of land in Schleswig-Holstein (990 403 ha) is used for agriculture (national average 47%).

Cultivated crops:

 Wheat, 208 000 ha
 Maize for silage, 176 000 ha
 Winter rapeseed, 112 000 ha
 Sugar beet, 7 500 ha
 Potatoes, 5 500 ha

There are some special cultivation regions:
 Elbmarschen, west of Hamburg for fruits cultivation
 Ditmarschen for cabbage
 Between Mölln and Lübeck for asparagus
 Pinnenberg for tree nurseries and flower garden (especially, roses of Rosen Tantau and W. Kordes' Söhne), 2 931 ha. These 2 companies have over 50% of the world cut roses market. There is a German Nurseries Museum ("Deutsches Baumschulmuseum").

Animal husbandry

The dairy and cattle farming in connection with fodder cultivation is mainly concentrated on the marshland and the bordering Geest areas. In 2020, around 1 million cattle including 360,000 dairy cows were counted in Schleswig-Holstein, rank 4th of German states. Livestock is continuously declining.

It is now the main dairy cow around the world.

Pig breeding is mainly found in the Schleswig-Holstein Uplands. In principle, Schleswig-Holstein is one of the regions with relatively few pigs (a total of around 1.6 million; in comparison Lower Saxony: over 8 million). Poultry and sheep are also of little importance in animal husbandry.

Schleswig-Holstein had Europe's largest snake farm in Uetersen with over 600 venomous reptiles, but it closed in 2019.

Fishing and Aquaculture

Total production from fishing in North and Baltic Seas was 40 780 tonnes in 2019, ca. 1/3 German production.

In the Baltic Sea total production amounted to 10377 tonnes (2019), of which 5432 tonnes of sprat, 2568 tonnes of flatfish and 1190 tonnes of cod.

In the North Sea the numbers were 19,487 tonnes of mussels, 3560 tonnes of North Sea shrimp, 1166 tonnes of herring and 7062 other fishes.

The one important aquaculture product is mussels, 16864 tonnes.

Inland fishing and aquaculture is not significant with 221 and 250 tonnes in 2019 respectively.

Companies
The largest company headquarters in Schleswig-Holstein with annual sales over 1 billion euros are:
 Wholesaler Bartels-Langness, Kiel 5.3 billion €
 Conglomerate Possehl, Lübeck 3.8 billion €
 Medical equipment manufacturer Drägerwerke, Lübeck 3.4 billion €
 Telecommunication service provider Freenet, Büdelsdorf 2.9 billion € 
 Oil refinery Heide, Hemmingstedt 2.4 billion € 
 Submarine shipyards ThyssenKrupp Marine Systems, Kiel 1.8 billion €

The unemployment rate stood at 5.0% in October 2021.

Industries
 Shipbuilding. Ca. 20% of German shipbuilding. The biggest ship yard ThyssenKrupp Marine Systems situated in Kiel and build submarines of 212 and 214 types. In Flensburg FSG yard build ferries. Famous luxury megayachts are built by Lürssen-Kröger Werft, Schacht-Audorf and Nobiskrug, Rendsburg. Shipyards in Lübeck and Caterpillar-MaK marine engine plant were closed. Raytheon Anschütz deliveries navigation equipment, autopilots, radars to shipyards.

 Locomotive. Vossloh Locomotives (owned by Chinese CRRC) manufactures three models of diesel-hydraulic (G6, G12, G18) and two models of diesel-electric (DE12, DE18) locomotives. Other manufacturer was Voith Turbo Lokomotivtechnik, but closed in 2014 year. Both firms are in Kiel.

 Industrial equipment. Fish and poultry processing machinery from Baader, Lübeck, bottle washers and pasteurizers from Krones, Flensburg, grinding machine tools from Peter Wolters, Rendsburg, machinery to manufacture man-made fibers and non-woven textile from Oerlikon Neumag and Oerlikon Nonwoven, Neumünster.
 Medical and labor equipment. Drägerwerk, Lübeck manufacture breathing equipment, medical ventilators and monitors, anesthetic machines, neonatal incubators, gas detectors, drug testing equipment, diving equipment, rebreathers, breathalyzer . The company delivery breathing devices for reanimation COVID-19 patients. Euroimmun, Lübeck produces test systems with which antibodies can be determined in the serum of patients and thus autoimmune and infectious diseases (including COVID-19) as well as allergies.
 Chemical. Almost all chemical industry concentrate around Brunsbüttel. Covestro with 650 employee produced annually 400 000 tonnes methylene diphenyl diisocyanate, which using in synthesis of polyurethane. Yara (214 empl.) produce nitrogen fertilizers, but with special process instead of using natural gas, it use heavy oil, which allow also manufacture as byproduct vanadium oxide and sulphur. Heavy oil is source material to produce bitumen by Total Bitumen (130 empl.). Other plant is Sasol (520 empl.) produce fatty and Guerbet alcohols, paraffin and high-purity aluminum oxide, aluminum hydroxide and triethylaluminium. Other important location of chemical industry is Neumünster with EMS-Griltech which manufacture technical fibers from polyamides and polyesters, adhesives and powder coatings.

Transport

Kiel Canal

The most important transport way in Schleswig-Holstein is Kiel Canal, which connect Brunsbüttel on North Sea with Kiel on Baltic Sea. Total cargo of ships reach peaks in 2007 and 2012, after that it continuous decline with 73.8 million tonnes in 2020.

Ports
The state has a total of 46 public ports and landing stages, four of which fulfill international transit functions: Kiel, Lübeck / Travemünde and Puttgarden on the Baltic Sea, Brunsbüttel on the North Sea. Kiel and Lübeck are also important for freight traffic to Scandinavia and Eastern Europe. Lübeck-Travemünde and Kiel are also important ferry and cruise ports. Puttgarden is the German port of the Vogelfluglinie to Denmark. Brunsbüttel is an important port for bulk goods and also serves as the basis for the offshore wind energy industry.

Education
Compulsory education starts for children who are six years old on 30 June. All children attend a "Grundschule", which is Germany's equivalent to primary school, for the first 4 years and then move on to a secondary school. In Schleswig-Holstein there are "Gemeinschaftsschulen", which is a type of comprehensive school. The regional schools, which go by the German name "Regionalschule" have been done away with as of 1 January 2014. The option of a Gymnasium is still available.

During the schoolyear 2021/2022, there are 393 Grundschulen in Schleswig-Holstein educating 101.675 students. Combined with secondary schools, there are a total of 360.922 Students in Schleswig-Holstein.

In a comparison of the federal states, Schleswig-Holstein has the highest student-to-teacher ratio in Germany at around 16.5:1 (national average: 15.2:1). In addition, Schleswig-Holstein is 14th from 16 federal state in terms of expenditure per pupil at public schools with around 5750 euros (national average: 6500 euros).

There are three universities in Kiel (classical, budget 167.1 M€), Lübeck (medicine, budget 80.8 M€) and Flensburg (pedagogical, 37.4 M€). Six public Universities of Applied Sciences exist in Wedel, Altenholz, Flensburg, Heide, Kiel, and Lübeck. There is the Conservatory in Lübeck and the Muthesius Academy of Fine Arts in Kiel. There are also three private institutions of higher learning.

See also

 Outline of Germany
 Schleswig
 Holstein-Glückstadt
 Dukes of Holstein-Gottorp
 Schleswig-Holstein-Sonderburg
 Schleswig-Holstein-Sonderburg-Glücksburg
 Schleswig-Holstein-Sonderburg-Beck
 Schleswig-Holstein-Sonderburg-Augustenburg
 Schleswig-Holstein-Sonderburg-Plön
 Schleswig-Holstein-Sonderburg-Norburg
 Schleswig-Holstein-Sonderburg-Plön-Rethwisch
 Coat of arms of Schleswig
Region Sønderjylland-Schleswig
Schleswig-Holstein Police

References

External links

 Official government portal
 
 

 
NUTS 1 statistical regions of the European Union
States and territories established in 1946
1946 establishments in Germany
Danish-speaking countries and territories
States of Germany